Giorgio Oppi (8 February 1940 – 26 July 2022) was an Italian politician. He served as a member of the Chamber of Deputies of Italy until 12 May 2009. Oppi died in July 2022, at the age of 82.

References 

1940 births
2022 deaths
Members of the Chamber of Deputies (Italy)
Deputies of Legislature XV of Italy
Deputies of Legislature XVI of Italy
Christian Democracy (Italy) politicians
Christian Democratic Centre politicians
Union of the Centre (2002) politicians
Members of the Regional Council of Sardinia
People from the Province of South Sardinia
20th-century Italian politicians
21st-century Italian politicians